Muhammad Karim (born May 1, 1995) is an alpine skier from Pakistan. He became the second Pakistani to participate in a Winter Olympics when he competed at the 2014 Winter Olympics in Sochi. He participated in the slalom and giant slalom events and got a rank of 71 in the giant slalom. He also competed in the 2018 Winter Olympics. He participated in the giant slalom and secured a rank of 72.

Career
Karim made his debut in the 2011 South Asian Winter Games held in India. During the 2013/2014 season, he participated in FIS events held in Iran and Turkey. His best finishes were 13th in Giant Slalom and 18th in Slalom.

2014 Winter Olympics
Karim placed 71st out of 109 athletes in the giant slalom event at the Sochi Olympics with a time of 3:27.41

2017 Asian Winter Games
In 2017, he was named to Pakistan's Asian Winter Games team.

2018 Winter Olympics
Karim ranked 72 in the giant slalom event at the PyeongChang Olympics with a time of 2:54.04.

See also
Pakistan at the 2014 Winter Olympics
Pakistan at the 2018 Winter Olympics

References

External links 

 Muhammad Karim on Instagram

1995 births
Living people
Pakistani male alpine skiers
Olympic alpine skiers of Pakistan
Alpine skiers at the 2014 Winter Olympics
Alpine skiers at the 2018 Winter Olympics
Alpine skiers at the 2022 Winter Olympics
People from Gilgit-Baltistan
Alpine skiers at the 2017 Asian Winter Games